A sundial is a timekeeping device.

Sundial or sun dial may also refer to:

Sundials
Analemmatic sundial, showing more than just the time of day
Digital sundial, with digital display
Scottish sundial, decorative sundials of the renaissance period
Kirkdale sundial, Saxon sundial
Whitehurst & Son sundial, very accurate sundial
Carefree sundial, very large sundial in Arizona

Places
Sundial, West Virginia
Sun Dial (restaurant), a revolving restaurant in Atlanta, Georgia
Sundial (Olympic Mountains), a mountain in Washington state
The Sundial (Zion), a mountain in Zion National Park, Utah

Music and literature
Sun Dial (band), a British psychedelic rock band 
"Sundials" (song), a song by Alkaline Trio
The Sundial, novel by Shirley Jackson
Sundial, novel by Catriona Ward
"Sundial", a song by Wolfmother from their 2009 album Cosmic Egg
"Sundial", a song by Bicep from their 2021 album Isles
"Sundial", EP by Mirah

Other
Sundial snail, the common name for mollusks in the Architectonicidae family
Sundial, an amusement ride in Planet Coaster

See also
Solar dial, a type of electric timer switch